Gabriel Ríos (born August 25, 1978 in San Juan, Puerto Rico) is a Puerto Rican singer songwriter.

Biography
Gabriel was born in Puerto Rico, to Puerto Rican parents, and was raised on the island until the age of 17. He then relocated to the city of Ghent in Belgium to study painting. Ríos quickly formed various bands, breaking into the local music scene. His first record, Ghostboy (2005), was produced by Jo Bogaert (of Technotronic) and featured a mix of Latin, hip hop, rock and electronica. The main single, "Broad Daylight," was well received in Belgium, Netherlands and France. Angelhead (2007), also produced by Bogaert delved further into pop electronica and helped him secure a live following as well as a steady summer festival presence.

A change of course saw Ríos abandoning electronic instruments and beats and recording his third album The Dangerous Return (2010), with jazz pianist Jef Neve and frequent collaborator Kobe Proesmans on percussion.

In 2011, Ríos moved to New York City to write songs for a new record that he hoped would feature little more than guitar and vocals. A growing attraction to performing solo led to a three-year informal residency at Rockwood Music Hall where he met musician/producer Ruben Samama, who would go on to play contrabass and also produce the record. Cellist Amber Docters van Leeuwen completed the trio and it was this formation that would serve as the basis for the sound of the following record. It became apparent that the album would have to be recorded live with limited overdubbing and, searching for an adequate room, they ended up in Dreamland Studios, a converted wooden chapel in Woodstock, New York. Ríos went on to release a song a month for a year, further compiling them under the title This Marauder's Midnight (2014). Although the album was available on iTunes, Spotify and Deezer in most countries, an international physical released was launched in early 2015.

The special edition of the record contains a short story titled A Marauder's Midnight that was penned by Ríos and friend Keith Godfrey, and illustrated by Belgian artist Tinus Vermeersch.

All videos for the record are actually live performances filmed by director Michael Sewandono, and consequently feature different audio versions than on the record. These too are compiled in the special edition. A dance remix version of the album's first single "Gold" by Thomas Jack went viral reaching number one in the Norwegian charts.

Flore (2021), Gabriel Ríos’ 5th studio album, is a paean to the music of Latin America and the Caribbean. More specifically, these are songs that go back to both his father and grandfather’s youth. It’s a heady concoction that’s simultaneously nostalgic and iconoclastic in the rediscovery of a musical hemisphere that Rios left behind two decades ago when leaving Puerto Rico for Europe. It’s a Latin album made in isolation and exile, not only because it was birthed during last year’s pandemic, but because it finds Ríos looking back from afar, maybe for the first time, to what remains of his past and his roots.

Discography

Albums

Mini albums

Live albums

Compilation albums

Others
2007: Angelhead + Morehead (2 CD Limited edition) (Angelhead album + Morehead mini album)

Singles

*Did not appear in the official Belgian Ultratop 50 charts, but rather in the bubbling under Ultratip charts.

References

External links
Official website

1978 births
Living people
21st-century Puerto Rican male singers